Maurice Léna (24 December 1859 – 31 March 1928) was a French dramatist and librettist of the Parisian Belle Époque. His opera librettos include Jules Massenet's Le jongleur de Notre-Dame (1902), Georges Hüe's Dans l'ombre de la cathédrale (1921), Charles-Marie Widor's Nerto (1924) and Henry Février's La Damnation de Blanchefleur (1920).

References

1859 births
1928 deaths
20th-century French dramatists and playwrights
French opera librettists
Belle Époque